Brütten is a municipality in the district of Winterthur, in the Canton of Zürich, Switzerland.

History
Brütten is first mentioned in 876  as Pritta.

Geography

Of this area, 58.9% is used for agricultural purposes, while 30.1% is forested. The rest of the land, (11%) is settled.   housing and buildings made up 6.1% of the total area, while transportation infrastructure made up the rest (4.6%).    7.2% of the total municipal area was undergoing some type of construction.

The municipality is located on a high plateau west of the Kempt and Töss Valleys.  It includes the village of Brütten along with the hamlets of Strubikon, Birch, Eich and since 1922 Obereich.

Demographics
, 5.7% of the population was made up of foreign nationals.   the gender distribution of the population was 50.5% male and 49.5% female. Over the last 10 years the population has grown at a rate of 9.7%. Most of the population speaks German  (95.1%), with English being second most common ( 1.3%) and French being third ( 1.1%).

In the 2007 election the most popular party was the SVP which received 36.2% of the vote.  The next three most popular parties were the FDP (16.7%), the SPS (12.7%) and the CSP (11.7%).

The age distribution of the population is children and teenagers (0–19 years old) make up 24.1% of the population, while adults (20–64 years old) make up 64.4% and seniors (over 64 years old) make up 11.4%.  The entire Swiss population is generally well educated.  In Brütten about 90.1% of the population (between age 25-64) have completed either non-mandatory upper secondary education or additional higher education (either university or a Fachhochschule).  There are 744 households in Brütten.

Brütten has an unemployment rate of 1.22%.  , there were 92 people employed in the primary economic sector and about 29 businesses involved in this sector.  44 people are employed in the secondary sector and there are 16 businesses in this sector.  197 people are employed in the tertiary sector, with 49 businesses in this sector.   54.4% of the working population were employed full-time, and 45.6% were employed part-time.

 there were 391 Catholics and 1080 Protestants in Brütten. In the 2000 census, religion was broken down into several smaller categories. Of the rest of the population, 0% were Muslim, 0.9% belonged to another religion (not listed), 2.1% did not give a religion, and 12.6% were atheist or agnostic.

The historical population is given in the following table:

References

External links

 Official website 
 

Municipalities of the canton of Zürich